Telen is a Norwegian daily local newspaper covering Hjartdal, Notodden, Sauherad (former), and published in Notodden. It has a circulation of 5,142 (2007) and owned by the Skien-newspaper Varden, a subsidiary of Edda Media.

References

Daily newspapers published in Norway
Mass media in Telemark
Notodden